Martinsburg is a village in Dixon County, Nebraska, United States. It is part of the Sioux City, IA–NE–SD Metropolitan Statistical Area. The population was 94 at the 2010 census.

History
Martinsburg was laid out in 1874. It was named for its founder, Jonathan Martin.

A post office was established at Martinsburg (also spelled historically Martinsburgh) in 1880, and remained in operation until it was discontinued in 1967.

Geography
Martinsburg is located at  (42.508650, -96.832281).

Demographics

2010 census
As of the census of 2010, there were 94 people, 38 households, and 27 families residing in the village. The racial makeup of the village was 97.9% White, 1.1% Asian, and 1.1% from two or more races. Hispanic or Latino of any race were 3.2% of the population.

There were 38 households, of which 36.8% had children under the age of 18 living with them, 55.3% were married couples living together, 15.8% had a female householder with no husband present, and 28.9% were non-families. 28.9% of all households were made up of individuals, and 15.8% had someone living alone who was 65 years of age or older. The average household size was 2.47 and the average family size was 3.04.

The median age in the village was 45.5 years. 28.7% of residents were under the age of 18; 4.3% were between the ages of 18 and 24; 16.9% were from 25 to 44; 37.2% were from 45 to 64; and 12.8% were 65 years of age or older. The gender makeup of the village was 41.5% male and 58.5% female.

2000 census
At the 2000 census, there were 103 people, 39 households and 26 families residing in the village. The racial makeup of the village was 99.03% White, and 0.97% from two or more races. Hispanic or Latino of any race were 1.94% of the population.

There were 39 households, of which 38.5% had children under the age of 18 living with them, 59.0% were married couples living together, 2.6% had a female householder with no husband present, and 30.8% were non-families. 30.8% of all households were made up of individuals, and 20.5% had someone living alone who was 65 years of age or older. The average household size was 2.64 and the average family size was 3.37.

32.0% of the population were under the age of 18, 5.8% from 18 to 24, 23.3% from 25 to 44, 20.4% from 45 to 64, and 18.4% who were 65 years of age or older. The median age was 40 years. For every 100 females, there were 87.3 males. For every 100 females age 18 and over, there were 84.2 males.

As of 2000 the median income for a household was $38,333 and the median family income was $40,938. Males had a median income of $26,750 versus $17,917 for females. The per capita income for the village was $11,750. There were no families and 5.8% of the population living below the poverty line, including no under eighteens and 57.1% of those over 64.

References

Villages in Dixon County, Nebraska
Villages in Nebraska
Sioux City metropolitan area